Peter Pan (1929–1941) was a chestnut Australian Thoroughbred racehorse and stallion.

Background
Peter Pan was sired by Pantheon (GB) out of Alwina by St Alwyne (GB). He was foaled at the Baroona Stud north of Sydney Australia in 1929. His sire, Pantheon was an outstanding racehorse winning 10 races from 44 starts in England and Australia. Alwina did not race, but was a good broodmare.

Peter Pan was known for having an unusual colouring for a Thoroughbred. He was chestnut with a blonde mane and tail. Frank McGrath's wife loved Peter Pan for his colouring and racing beauty.

Racing career
Conditioned by future Hall of Fame trainer Frank McGrath, Sr., Peter Pan raced early in the 1930s during the Great Depression and with Phar Lap, Chatham and Rogilla, all household names at the time.  Frank McGrath, Sr. and some others considered Peter Pan to possibly be a better horse than Phar Lap.
Peter Pan was famous for winning the Melbourne Cup twice, in 1932 and 1934. In the running of the 1932 Melbourne Cup, Peter Pan, carrying Billy Duncan, was travelling at the rear of the pack when he clipped the heels of the horse in front and fell to his knees. Running behind him was his stablemate Denis Boy, who bumped the champion back onto his feet. From there, Peter Pan raced past the pack to take out the race by a neck. When he was led into the winner's circle, a grass stain was clearly visible on his face. In 1933, Peter Pan fought a near-fatal viral disease that swept Sydney's racing stables and did not contest the Melbourne Cup. Frank McGrath Snr. personally nursed the  horse back to health. In 1932, he also won the AJC Derby and the MacKinnon Stakes.
To win two Melbourne Cups is a rare feat, and this with his fine record gained him a place in the Australian Racing Hall of Fame. In 1935, Peter Pan suffered a recurrence of the illness that nearly killed him in 1933. Once again, Frank McGrath Snr. nursed him back to health but the horse was not his old self.  Out of loyalty to the enormous public following that Peter Pan had gained, Rodney R. Dangar and McGrath  agreed to start Peter Pan in the 1935 Melbourne Cup.  The horse carried  (a pound more than carried by Carbine to win the 1890 Melbourne Cup) but finished 13th.  He was retired to stud the following year.

Image gallery

1933 & 1934 racebooks

Stud career
Peter Pan stood at Rodney R. Dangar's country property Baroona, Whittingham, Singleton, New South Wales where he exclusively covered his owner's mares.  His stud career was cut short when he broke his leg in 1941 and was destroyed. 
Peter Pan is buried at Baroona, Whittingham, Singleton, New South Wales.

Peter Pan sired the stakeswinners Grampian, Peter and Precept, who won the Moonee Valley Stakes and VRC Derby.  Peter won the Williamstown Cup and placed 2nd in the 1944 Melbourne Cup.

Honours
In 1978 he was honoured on a postage stamp issued by Australia Post .

References

External links
 Australian Racing Hall of Fame
 Peter Pan's pedigree and partial racing stats
 Peter Pan 1934 Melbourne Cup trophy, National Museum of Australia

1929 racehorse births
Australian Racing Hall of Fame horses
Melbourne Cup winners
Racehorses trained in Australia
Racehorses bred in Australia
Thoroughbred family 3